Taba Taghavi Rafsanjani also simply known as Taba Taghavi (born 23 April 1992) is a French-Iranian professional squash player. She competed at the 2017 Women's Asian Individual Squash Championships representing Iran. She achieved her highest career PSA ranking of 120 in February 2017 during the 2016–17 PSA World Tour.

References

External links 
 
 

1992 births
Living people
French female squash players
Iranian female squash players
Sportspeople from Reims